An allylic rearrangement or allylic shift is an organic reaction in which the double bond in an allyl chemical compound shifts to the next carbon atom. It is encountered in nucleophilic substitution.

In reaction conditions that favor a SN1 reaction mechanism, the intermediate is a carbocation for which several resonance structures are possible. This explains the product distribution (or product spread) after recombination with nucleophile Y. This type of process is called an SN1' substitution.  

Alternatively, it is possible for nucleophile to attack  directly at the allylic position, displacing the leaving group in a single step, in a process referred to as SN2' substitution. This is likely in cases when the allyl compound is unhindered, and a strong nucleophile is used.  The products will be similar to those seen with SN1' substitution. Thus reaction of 1-chloro-2-butene with sodium hydroxide gives a mixture of 2-buten-1-ol and 3-buten-2-ol: 

Nevertheless, the product in which the OH group is on the primary atom is minor. In the substitution of 1-chloro-3-methyl-2-butene, the secondary 2-methyl-3-buten-2-ol is produced in a yield of 85%, while that for the primary 3-methyl-2-buten-1-ol is 15%.

In one reaction mechanism the nucleophile attacks not directly at the electrophilic site but in a conjugate addition over the double bond:

This is usual in allylic compounds which have a bulky leaving group in SN2 conditions or bulky non-leaving substituent  which give rise to significant steric hindrance, thereby increasing the conjugate substitution. This kind of reaction is termed SN1' or SN2', depending on whether the reaction follows SN1-like mechanism or SN2-like mechanism. Similar to how there are SN1' and SN2' analogues for SN1 and SN2 reactions respectively, there also is an analogue for SNi, that being the SNi', applicable for reactions betwixt allylic compounds and reagents like SOCl2.

Scope
The synthetic utility can be extended to substitutions over butadiene bonds:

Reaction in methanol and catalyst diisopropylethylamine

In the first step of this macrocyclization the thiol group in one end of 1,5-pentanedithiol reacts with the butadiene tail in 1 to the enone 2 in  an allylic shift with a sulfone leaving group which reacts further with the other end in a conjugate addition reaction.

In one study the allylic shift was applied twice in a ring system:

In this reaction sequence a Jacobsen epoxidation adds an epoxy group to a diene which serves as the leaving group in reaction with the pyrazole nucleophile. The second nucleophile is methylmagnesium bromide expulsing the pyrazole group.

An SN2' reaction should explain the outcome of the reaction of an aziridine carrying a methylene bromide group with methyllithium:

In this reaction one equivalent of acetylene is lost. 

Examples of allylic shifts:
Ferrier rearrangement
Meyer–Schuster rearrangement

SN2' reduction
In one adaptation called a SN2' reduction a formal organic reduction on an allyl group containing a good leaving group is accompanied by a rearrangement. One example of such reaction is found as part of a taxol total synthesis (ring C):

The hydride is lithium aluminium hydride and the leaving group a phosphonium salt. The product contains a new exocyclic double bond. Only when the cyclohexane ring is properly substituted will the proton add in a trans position with respect to the adjacent methyl group. A conceptually related reaction is the Whiting reaction forming dienes.

Electrophilic allyl shifts
Allyl shifts can also take place with electrophiles. In the example below the carbonyl group in benzaldehyde is activated by diboronic acid prior to reaction with the allyl alcohol (see: Prins reaction):

References

Rearrangement reactions
Reaction mechanisms